Bushehr Province is one of the 31 provinces of Iran. It is in the south of the country, with a long coastline on the Persian Gulf. The city of Bushehr is the provincial capital. At the 2006 census, the province's population was 886,490 in 188,762 households. The following census in 2011 counted 1,032,949 people in 246,742 households. At the 2016 census, the province's population was 1,163,400 in 321,826 households.

The province was made a part of Region 2 upon the division of the provinces into five regions, solely for coordination and development purposes, on 22 June 2014.

Administrative Divisions

Cities 
According to the 2016 census, 835,955 people (over 71% of the population of Bushehr province) live in the following cities: Ab Pakhsh 18,913, Abad 3,787, Abdan 6,827, Ahram 15,198, Ali Shahr 23,178, Anarestan 3,400, Asaluyeh 13,557, Baduleh 4,028, Bandar Deylam 25,730, Bandar Ganaveh 73,472, Bandar Kangan 60,187, Bandar Rig 6,252, Bandar Siraf 6,992, Bandar-e Deyr 24,083, Bank 14,126, Bardestan 7,112, Borazjan 110,567, Bord Khun 5,333, Bushehr 223,504, Bushkan 2,135, Choghadak 18,702, Dalaki 6,436, Delvar 4,442, Dowrahak 4,852, Imam Hassan 2,731, Jam 31,436, Kaki 12,119, Kalameh 2,463, Kharg 8,193, Khormoj 40,722, Nakhl Taqi 18,837, Riz 3,282, Sadabad 8,248, Shabankareh 7,900, Shonbeh 2,747, Tang-e Eram 3,242, and Vahdatiyeh 11,222.

Demographics

Language 
A vast majority of the population speak Persian (mostly the Fars dialect) as first language with a minority of Arabic speakers.

Religion 
The vast majority of Bushehr's population are Shia Muslims, with a minority of Sunnis comprising 8.5% of the province's population.

History
The Greeks knew of Bushehr by Mezambria during the battles of Nearchus. A French excavating team however in 1913 determined the origin of Bushehr to date back to the Elamite Empire. A city there, known as Lyan, contained a temple that was designed to protect the compound from naval attacks. Its remains can still be seen today 10 kilometers south of the present city of Bushehr.

Marco Polo describes this region as part of the Persian province of Shabankareh. It contains the village of Saba, Iran where are buried (he was told) the three Magi which visited the Christ Child.

A key turning point in the history of Bor event of significance is known to have taken place in this region until the arrival of the European colonialists in the 16th century.

The Portuguese, invaded the city of Bushehr in 1506 and remained there until Shah Abbas Safavi defeated and liberated the Persian Gulf region of their presence. By 1734, Bushehr had once again risen to prominence due to Nader Shah of the Afsharid dynasty, and his military policies in The Persian Gulf.

Bushehr was selected by Nader to be the central base of Nader's Naval fleet in the Persian Gulf. He thus changed the name of the city to Bandar e Naderiyeh (Nader's Port). He hired an Englishman by the name of John Elton to help build his fleet. Dutch accounts report his naval fleet to have amounted to 8000-10000 personnel as well as several ship construction installations.

After Nader's death, the Dutch continued to have good commercial relations in Bushehr, until the British made their debut in Bushehr in 1763 by a contract they signed with Karim Khan of the Zand dynasty. By then, the city of Bushehr had become Iran's major port city in the Persian Gulf. By the Qajar era, Britain, Norway, Russia, Italy, France, Germany, and the Ottomans had diplomatic and commercial offices there, with Britain steadily gaining a foothold in the area. Close to 100 British ships are reported to have docked at the port city every year during the Qajar era.

2013 Bushehr earthquake

A strong earthquake measuring 6.1 on the Richter magnitude scale struck the town of Shonbeh and villages of Shonbeh and Tasuj District in Dashti County of Bushehr Province on 9 April 2013, killing at least 37 people.

Bushehr today

Aside from the revived port city of Bushehr, which is the second main naval port of Iran after Bandar Abbas, Bushehr also has come back recently in the spotlight for three main reasons:

Kharg Island (Khark Island)
During the Iran-Iraq war, Iran's major petroleum exporting ports in Khuzestan sustained damages so severe that a second port in Kharg Island was selected to carry on the major responsibility of Iran's petroleum exports, though even Kharg was not immune from Iraqi air raids.

Bushehr Nuclear Reactor

The Bushehr Light water PWR Nuclear Reactor, designed by Siemens AG, built by the Russians, is Iran's first Nuclear Power Plant reactor.

The industrial corridor of Assalouyeh
As many as 70,000 foreign engineers and technicians are currently working in this industrial zone 270 kilometers south of the provincial capital. This zone is where the nearby famous South Pars Gas field is located, where Iran has invested hundreds of millions of dollars in infrastructure. The South Pars Gas field is the world's largest natural gas field.

The Assalouyeh industrial zone is deemed so lucrative that even American companies such as American Allied International Corp and Halliburton have bypassed American sanctions to become somehow involved in the zone.American Allied International Corporation - Assalouyeh

Colleges and universities
Persian Gulf University
Bushehr University of Medical Sciences
Islamic Azad University of Bushehr
Islamic Azad University of Borazjan
Islamic Azad University of Shabankare
Islamic Azad University of Khormuj
Islamic Azad University of Khark
Iran Nuclear Energy College
Payame Noor University of Bushehr

Sports
Football is the most popular sports in Boushehr. Boushehr is home to both famous football teams: Shahin-e Boushehr and  
Pars Jonoubi jam.

Shahin is one of the oldest soccer team in Iran which has found in 1942. Shahin is one of the most popular teams in current Iranian football league just like Tractor-Sazi from Tabriz.

Sajjad Gharibi (born 19 December 1991) is an Iranian bodybuilder. He born on Khozestan, Ahwaz, and has lived in Busher. He has become famous in world because of his special physique. His musculus volume is extraordinary for his height, 186 cm (6'2" tall), and weight, 180 kg (390 lb). He has looked like The Incredible Hulk character, because of his size, his Iranian fans have called him Iranian Hulk.

Some attractions of Bushehr

Despite its unique potentials, Bushehr remains to be developed for absorbing tourists and seriously lacks the necessary investment for tourism. The city of Bushehr has 3-star hotels, an airport, and modern amenities. The Cultural heritage Organization of Iran lists up to 45 sites of historical and cultural significance in the province. Some are listed below:

Persian Gulf Beach(Bushehr)
Deje Borazjan
Kakhe tauke (borazjan)
Shahzade Ebrahim (Shazabreim)
Qal'eh Holandiha (The Dutch Castle)
Mabad Poseidon, (Poseidon's temple)
Gurestan Bastani (the ancient cemetery)
Imamzadeh Mir Mohammed Hanifeh
Aramgah (tomb of) Haj Mohammed Ibrahim Esfahani
The Old Church of Kharg Island
Qavam water reservoir
Qazi House
Maqbareh (tomb of) the English General
Shaykh Sadoon Mosque
The Holy Christ Church
House of Raies Ali Delvari
House of Malik
The ancient site of Ray-Shahr which is located 8 km south of Bushehr.
Tomb of Abdul mohaymrn
House Darya Baygui
House of Dehdashti
Castle of Khormuj

Literature
Bushehr has been home to some famous poets. Among them are Faiez Dashti (Dashtestani) (1830-1919) and Manouchehr Atashi.  Faiez poems, and Dashti(or Dashtestani) literature in general, resemble Baba Taher's works. Sadeq Chubak, Najaf Daryabandari, and Moniro Ravanipour are among the most prominent writers in the literature of Bushehr.

References

External links

Bushehr Cultural Heritage Organization
Iran Oil Terminals Company
Iran Petrochemical Commercial Company
Pars Special Economic Energy Zone
National Iranian Gas Company
National Petrochemical Company of Iran 
Bushehr Province Department of Education (in Persian)
Official website of Shahin Club (in Persian)
Iranian textbooks On Bushehr province (in Persian)

 
Provinces of Iran